The Foreign Legionnaire (German: Fremdenlegionär) is a 1928 German silent adventure film directed by James Bauer and starring Dorothea Wieck, Ferdinand Martini and Therese Giehse. It was made at the Emelka Studios in Munich. Location shooting took place in Spanish Morocco. The film's sets were designed by the art director Ludwig Reiber.

Cast
 Dorothea Wieck as Lore  
 Ferdinand Martini as Der Vater  
 Therese Giehse as Die Mutter  
 Oskar Marion as Karl Rittner  
 Rolf Pinegger as Sein Vater  
 Gustav Fröhlich as Martin Frey  
 Joop van Hulzen as Legionär Mac Roy  
 Manfred Voss as Ein junger Franzose  
 Rio Nobile as Französischer Offizier

References

Bibliography
 Bock, Hans-Michael & Bergfelder, Tim. The Concise Cinegraph: Encyclopaedia of German Cinema. Berghahn Books, 2009.

External links

1928 films
Films of the Weimar Republic
German silent feature films
Films directed by James Bauer
French Foreign Legion in popular culture
Bavaria Film films
German black-and-white films
Films shot at Bavaria Studios
Films about the French Foreign Legion
Films shot in Morocco